Leilia Adzhametova (born 3 September 1994) is a Ukrainian para-track and field athlete.

Adzhametova competed at the 2016 Summer Paralympics in the T13 classification, winning a gold medal in the women's 100 metres T13 event and a bronze medal in the women's 400 metres T13 event.

At the 2019 World Para Athletics Championships she won gold medals in the women's 100 m T13 and women's 100 m T13 events and a bronze medal in the women's 400 m T13 event.

See also 
 Ukraine at the 2016 Summer Paralympics

References

External links 
 
 Leilia Adzhametova at the 2019 World Para Athletics Championships

1994 births
Living people
Ukrainian female sprinters
Paralympic athletes of Ukraine
Paralympic gold medalists for Ukraine
Paralympic bronze medalists for Ukraine
Athletes (track and field) at the 2016 Summer Paralympics
Place of birth missing (living people)
World Para Athletics Championships winners
Paralympic medalists in athletics (track and field)
Medalists at the 2016 Summer Paralympics
Athletes (track and field) at the 2020 Summer Paralympics
21st-century Ukrainian women